Glyphostoma oenoa is a species of sea snail, a marine gastropod mollusk in the family Clathurellidae.

Description

Distribution
This species occurs in Caribbean waters along Florida and Puerto Rico.

References

oenoa
Gastropods described in 1934